Boris Kollár (born 14 August 1965), is a Slovak businessman and politician serving as the Speaker of the National Council of the Slovak Republic.

Political career
In 2015, he started the political party We Are Family. His party won 11 seats in the National Council during the 2016 Slovak parliamentary election.

In 2016, a source turned over to SME material linking Boris Kollár to the Slovak mafia. Kollar rejected the accusation as an attempt to discredit him.

Personal life
Kollár lived for a short period of time in Miami, United States. He has fathered 12 children with 10 different women.

References

1965 births
Living people
Speakers of the National Council (Slovakia)
Members of the National Council (Slovakia) 2016-2020
Members of the National Council (Slovakia) 2020-present
Businesspeople from Bratislava
Politicians from Bratislava
People involved in plagiarism controversies